was a town located in Senboku District, Akita Prefecture, Japan.

In 1603, it was the site of a rebellion by rōnin loyal to Onodera Yoshimichi.

As of 2003, the town had an estimated population of 7,061 and a density of 180.77 persons per km². The total area was 39.06 km².

On November 1, 2004, Rokugō, along with the town of Senhata and the village of Sennan (all from Senboku District), merged to create the town of Misato.

References

Bibliography

External links
 Rokugō official website of Misato

Dissolved municipalities of Akita Prefecture